was a feudal domain under the Tokugawa shogunate of Edo period Japan, located in Harima Province in what is now the southwestern portion of modern-day Hyōgo Prefecture. It was centered around the Hayashida jin'ya which was located in what is now the city of Himeji, Hyōgo and was controlled by the tozama daimyō Takebe clan throughout all of its history.

History
Takebe Mitsushige was the 700 koku Amagasaki gundai under Toyotomi Hideyoshi, and was married to an adopted daughter of Ikeda Terumasa. Their son, Takebe Masanaga, fought at the side of Ikeda Terumasa's sons at the Siege of Osaka from 1614-1615, and was rewarded by being made daimyō of Amagasaki Domain, an honor which he unusually shared with Ikeda Shigetoshi, with each having a kokudaka of 10,000 koku. This proved to be unwieldy, and when the Ikeda clan was transferred to Himeji Domain, Takebe Masanaga moved a slightly distance away to form Hayashida Domain in 1617. Although a tozama clan, the Takebe ruled the domain unbroken to the Meiji restoration. The 3rd daimyō, Takabe Masanori, served as Ōbangashira , Fushimi-bugyō and as Jisha-bugyō in the shogunal administration. The 7th daimyō, Takabe Masakata, established a Han school in 1794 and the 9th daimyō, Takebe Masanori, also served as Ōbangashira and castellan of Nijō Castle in Kyoto. The final daimyō, Takebe Masayo, served in the guard of Prince Kachō Hirotsune in 1868 and supported the Meiji government in the Boshin War.  The clan was ennobled with the kazoku peerage title of shishaku (viscount). 

The lecture hall of the han school survives, and is a Himeji City Important Cultural Property.

Holdings at the end of the Edo period
As with most domains in the han system, Hayashida Domain consisted of several discontinuous territories calculated to provide the assigned kokudaka, based on periodic cadastral surveys and projected agricultural yields. 

Harima Province 
25 villages in Itto District

List of daimyō 

{| class=wikitable
! #||Name || Tenure || Courtesy title || Court Rank || kokudaka 
|-
|colspan=6|  Takebe clan, 1617-1871 (Tozama)
|-
||1||||1617 - 1667||Tanba-no-kami (丹波守)|| Junior 5th Rank, Lower Grade (従五位下)||10,000 koku
|-
||2||||1667 - 1669||Tanba-no-kami (丹波守)|| Junior 5th Rank, Lower Grade (従五位下)||10,000 koku
|-
||3||||1670 - 1715||Naisho-no-kami (内匠頭)|| Junior 5th Rank, Lower Grade (従五位下)||10,000 koku
|-
||4||||1715 - 1732||Tanba-no-kami (丹波守)|| Junior 5th Rank, Lower Grade (従五位下)||10,000 koku
|-
||5||||1732 - 1762||Tanba-no-kami (丹波守)|| Junior 5th Rank, Lower Grade (従五位下)||10,000 koku
|-
||6||||1762 - 1764||Ōmi-no-kami (近江守)|| Junior 5th Rank, Lower Grade (従五位下)||10,000 koku
|-
||7||||1764 - 1812||Naisho-no-kami (内匠頭)|| Junior 5th Rank, Lower Grade (従五位下)||10,000 koku
|-
||8||||1812 - 1849||Naisho-no-kami (内匠頭)|| Junior 5th Rank, Lower Grade (従五位下)||10,000 koku
|-
||9||||1849 - 1863||Naisho-no-kami (内匠頭)|| Junior 5th Rank, Lower Grade (従五位下)||10,000 koku
|-
||10||||1863 - 1871||Naisho-no-kami (内匠頭)|| Junior 5th Rank, Lower Grade (従五位下)||10,000 koku
|-
|}

See also 
 List of Han
 Abolition of the han system

Further reading
 Bolitho, Harold. (1974). Treasures Among Men: The Fudai Daimyo in Tokugawa Japan. New Haven: Yale University Press.  ;  OCLC 185685588

References

Domains of Japan
1622 establishments in Japan
States and territories established in 1622
1871 disestablishments in Japan
States and territories disestablished in 1871
Harima Province
History of Hyōgo Prefecture